Thomas Costello  (1744 – 1831) was an Irish prelate who served as Bishop of Clonfert.

He was born in Ballaghaderreen. Coen went to the Irish College in Rome to study for the priesthood and was ordained priest in December 1767. Coen was appointed titular bishop of Milevum on 26 January 1816; and Diocesan Bishop of Clonfert on 6 July 1786. He died in post on 8 October 1831.

References

Roman Catholic bishops of Clonfert
19th-century Roman Catholic bishops in Ireland
1744 births
1831 deaths
People from County Roscommon